Ilchi-ye Bala (also Romanized as Īlchī-ye Bālā; also known as Īlchī) is a village in Deh Tall Rural District, in the Central District of Bastak County, Hormozgan Province, Iran. At the 2006 census, its population was 25, in 6 families.

References 

Populated places in Bastak County